Lismore may refer to:

Places
 Lismore, New South Wales, Australia 
 Lismore, Victoria, Australia
 Lismore, Nova Scotia, Canada
 Lismore, County Waterford, Ireland
 Lismore (Parliament of Ireland constituency), a former constituency in the Irish House of Commons
 Lismore Castle, County Waterford, Ireland

 Lismore, County Down, a townland in Dunsfort, County Down, Northern Ireland
 Lismore, County Tyrone, a townland in County Tyrone, Northern Ireland
 Lismore, New Zealand, a village near Mayfield, Canterbury, New Zealand
 Lismore, Scotland
 Lismore, Minnesota, United States

Literature
 Book of Lismore, a 15th-century Irish-Gaelic manuscript
 Book of the Dean of Lismore, a 16th-century Scottish-Gaelic manuscript

Sports
 Lismore GAA, a Gaelic Athletic Association club in Lismore, Ireland
 Lismore RFC, a rugby club based in Edinburgh

Other uses 
 Lismore (band), American electronic band from New Jersey
 , a WWII-era Australian Navy corvette
 Lismore, a Speyside single malt whisky from Scotland

See also
 Lismore College (disambiguation)
 Bishop of Lismore (disambiguation)